Amadou Djibo Mohamed Wonkoye (born 19 May 1994) is a Nigerien footballer who plays as a midfielder or winger for Horoya.

Career

As a youth player, Wonkoye joined the youth academy of Ghanaian side WAFA. After that, he signed for ASEC in Ivory Coast.

Before the second half of 2014/15, he signed for Portuguese second division club Braga B.

In 2017, Wonkoye signed for Horoya in Guinea.

References

External links
 
 Mohamed Wonkoye at playmakerstats.com

Association football wingers
Association football midfielders
Living people
Niger international footballers
Expatriate footballers in Ivory Coast
Expatriate footballers in Guinea
Expatriate footballers in Portugal
People from Niamey
ASEC Mimosas players
S.C. Braga B players
Horoya AC players
Guinée Championnat National players
Ligue 1 (Ivory Coast) players
Expatriate footballers in Ghana
Nigerien expatriate footballers
Nigerien footballers
1994 births